Castra of Albești was a fort in the Roman province of Dacia in the 3rd century AD. Its ruins are located in Albești (commune Poboru, Romania).

See also
List of castra

External links
Roman castra from Romania - Google Maps / Earth

Notes

Roman legionary fortresses in Dacia
Roman legionary fortresses in Romania
History of Muntenia
Historic monuments in Olt County